Callan O'Keeffe (born 9 June 1996) is a South African former racing driver, driver coach and founder of the School Of Send. He is a former member of both the Red Bull Junior Team and the Lotus F1 Junior Team.

Racing career

Karting 
O'Keeffe started karting at the age of 13. In 2010 he finished third in the KF3 CIK-FIA World Cup. In 2011 O'Keefe won the British Karting Junior Championship in and was the runner-up in the KF3 CIK-FIA World Cup.

Lower formulae 
O'Keeffe began his career in single-seater racing cars in 2012 with the Formula BMW Talent Cup. He won 4 races during the regular season. In the Grand Final, he only finished in ninth with 13 points.

In 2013 he competed in the ADAC Formel Masters for Lotus. He finished the season in thirteenth.

Formula Renault 
For the 2014 season, he signed a contract with the ART Junior Team to start in the Eurocup Formula Renault 2.0 and the Formula Renault 2.0 Northern European Cup. Later in the season, he switched his team driver for KTR alongside fellow Lotus F1 juniors Alex Albon and Gregor Ramsay. He took his first Formula Renault race win in the Northern European Cup at TT Circuit Assen. after also scoring his first pole position. At the end of the season he had scored one win and was on the podium three times. He was seventh in the drivers' standings with 187 points. In the Eurocup he collected a total of 28 points and finished sixteenth in the final drivers' standings.

In 2015 he joined Fortec Motorsports to compete in both the Eurocup Formula Renault 2.0 and the Formula Renault 2.0 Northern European Cup. In the Northern European Cup he scored 3 podiums and finished the season in seventh. In the Eurocup he only finished in fourteenth after leaving the series ahead of the final two rounds.

In 2016 he only competed in one round of the Formula Renault 2.0 Northern European Cup for JD Motorsport.

In 2019 he returned to the Formula Renault Eurocup with FA Racing by Drivex. Ahead of the fifth round at Circuit de Spa-Francorchamps he moved to M2 Competition. He finished the season in seventeenth.

BRDC British Formula 3 Championship 
In 2016 O'Keeffe competed in the BRDC British Formula 3 Auumn Trophy for Fortec Motorsport, where he finished third.

In 2017 he joined Douglas Motorsport for a full season in the BRDC British Formula 3 Championship. He scored 3 podiums and finished the season in sixth.

British LMP3 Cup 
In 2017 O'Keeffe also made his debut in sports car racing by competing in some events of the 2017 British LMP3 Cup together with his team Douglas Motorsport.

U.S. F2000 National Championship 
In 2017 O'Keeffe also competed in selected races of the U.S. F2000 National Championship.

Formula One 
In 2012 he was signed by the Red Bull Junior Team. He was dropped by Red Bull after the 2013 season. He then joined the Lotus F1 Junior Team in 2014. He parted ways with Lotus F1 prior to the 2015 season.

School Of Send 
After retiring from racing in 2019 O'Keeffe founded the driver development program School Of Send. The program offers simulator training, in-car tuition, online coaching and trackside support for its drivers. The programs current drivers include Matthew Rees, Hunter Yeany, Dilano van 't Hoff, Rui Andrade, Max Cuthbert and Sonny Smith. In 2021 Matthew Rees became the F4 British Championship champion with O'Keeffe as head coach.

Personal life 
As of 2019, O'Keeffe resides near St Albans, England.

Racing record

Racing career summary 

† O'Keeffe was ineligible to score points.

References

External links 

 
 https://www.schoolofsend.co.uk/

Living people
1996 births
South African racing drivers
British racing drivers
Karting World Championship drivers
Formula BMW drivers
ADAC Formel Masters drivers
Formula Renault Eurocup drivers
Formula Renault 2.0 NEC drivers
BRDC British Formula 3 Championship drivers
U.S. F2000 National Championship drivers
Motopark Academy drivers
R-ace GP drivers
ART Grand Prix drivers
KTR drivers
Fortec Motorsport drivers
JD Motorsport drivers
FA Racing drivers
Drivex drivers
M2 Competition drivers
Sportspeople from Johannesburg
South African expatriate sportspeople in England